Allison Maree Ritchie (born 28 July 1974 in Hobart) was a member of the Tasmanian Legislative Council (upper house) for Pembroke from 2001 to 2009. Since 2022, Ritchie has served as Deputy Mayor of the City of Clarence.

Life before Parliament
Ritchie grew up on Hobart's Eastern Shore and attended Mornington Primary School, Clarence High School, Rosny College and the University of Tasmania.  Coming form a family with strong political connections (an aunt, Carol Brown, is a federal senator and a great uncle was a state president of the ALP) Ritchie joined the Labor Party at age 14.

From 1993 to 1996 Ritchie worked as a manager for a private information technology company.

From 1996 to 2001 Ritchie was employed as the Executive Assistant to the State Secretary of the Tasmanian Branch of the Australian Labor Party.  Ritchie held many positions within the Party, including Branch Secretary, Platform Committee Member, Administrative Committee Member and Southern Convenor of the Labor Women's Network.

Political career
On 5 May 2001, Ritchie was elected to the Legislative Council. She was the youngest person ever elected to the Tasmanian upper house.

A notable component of her election campaign focussed on electoral reform and in particular, the disallowance of Members of Parliament to hold Local Government positions at the same time and the introduction of compulsory voting for Local Government elections.

On 24 November 2001, Ritchie became the first MP to marry for the first time while in office with her marriage to husband, David Cowle.  She also became the first woman to give birth while a member of the Legislative Council with the birth of her son in December 2002.

Following her election, Ritchie self funded an electorate office for service provision to constituents.  The model that was developed subsequently became the standard for all State MPs and are now Government funded to allow all MPs to establish electorate offices with appropriate staffing.

Ritchie was successful in achieving a number of improvements to the democratic processes of Tasmania.  She implemented improved transparency of the Tasmanian electoral system by securing the requirement for party affiliation information to be present on ballot papers for Legislative Council elections while serving as a Member of the Parliamentary Working Group into the 2004 Review of the Tasmanian Electoral Act.

Ritchie also developed the concept of mobile parking zones for people with disability.  The Tasmanian Electoral Commission introduced the system for polling booths without permanent disability parking zones thereby improving the access and democratic participation of people with disabilities. 

Ritchie served for 3 years as a board member of Oakdale Services Tasmania (an organisation providing accommodation and service to people with disability), and was also a long term patron for the Association for Children with Disability.

Controversially, she opposed legislation put forward by her own government in relation to a proposed development at Ralphs Bay. Ritchie was successful in proposing and supporting amendments to the legislation that ensured the conservation values of Ralphs Bay were maintained and were required to be considered as part of the Resource Planning and Development Commission's consideration of the project.

A foundation Member and State Convenor of Emily's List in Australia, Ritchie was also active in supporting the election of women candidates to Australian Parliaments.  Ritchie actively lobbied the Howard and Rudd governments for the introduction of a paid maternity leave scheme for all Australian women and was one of only four Australian MPs to make submission to the Productivity Commission's inquiry into Paid Parental Leave.

Ritchie also lobbied her State Government colleagues and the Law Reform Institute for the introduction of increased minimum sentences for sex offenders (in particular paedophiles).  She also actively campaigned for the introduction of Sentencing Councils in order to allow the Tasmanian people to have an appropriate and effective avenue to express concern and opinion in relation to sentencing outcomes.

During her time in parliament, Ritchie served as Parliamentary Secretary to the Treasurer (2005-2008), Minister for Planning and Workplace Relations (2008) and as Parliamentary Secretary for Economic Development (2009).

In June 2009 Ritchie attracted controversy over the employment of family members in her office.  A review by the Auditor-General found that no formal rules had been broken but that "the recommendation of her mother’s appointment, in the knowledge of a flawed assessment process, was not in accordance with the principles of openness and objectivity outlined in the Code of Conduct."

Ritchie stepped down as Minister due to ill health (understood to be the diagnosis of an auto immune disease) on 24 November 2008 and resigned from Parliament entirely on 20 June 2009.

Following her retirement from public life, Ritchie was recognised by the Administrative Committee of the ALP for her outstanding service to the people of Tasmania and for her operation of the best Labor office in Tasmania.

In January 2013, having resigned from the ALP in 2011, Ritchie announced her intention to contest once again the upper house seat of Pembroke as an independent at the election held on Saturday 4 May—the seat was retained by the Liberal candidate and incumbent councillor Vanessa Goodwin.

In the Clarence City Council election of 2022, Ritchie was elected Deputy Mayor and Councillor.

Private life
Since leaving Parliament, Ritchie has given birth to her second child, a daughter, in December 2010.  She has also established and jointly owns a farming business in rural Tasmania.

See also
 Electoral division of Pembroke

References

Additional Sources
- Official website for 2013 Pembroke campaign
Official Website - archived at The Wayback Machine
Legislative Council Hansard

Living people
Members of the Tasmanian Legislative Council
1974 births
Australian Labor Party members of the Parliament of Tasmania
21st-century Australian politicians
Women members of the Tasmanian Legislative Council
21st-century Australian women politicians